Brändö is an island municipality of Åland, Finland. Characteristics of Brändö are the numerous assembly of islands and islets, most important of which are linked by bridges and causeways.

Geography

Villages 
In 1967, Brändö had 12 legally recognized villages (henkikirjakylät):

 Asterholma
 Baggholma
 Björnholma
 Brändö
 Fiskö
 Hullberga
 Jurmo
 Korsö
 Lappo
 Porsskär
 Torsholma
 Åva

Demographics 
In 2020, 8.9% of the population of Brändö was under the age of 15, 58.1% were aged 15 to 64, and 33.0% were over the age of 65. The average age was 52.2, over the national average of 43.4 and regional average of 43.8. Speakers of Swedish made up 71.7% of the population and speakers of Finnish made up 18.9%, while the share of speakers of foreign languages was 9.4%. Foreign nationals made up 9.8% of the total population. Brändö has no urban areas.

The chart below, describing the development of the total population of Brändö from 1975 to 2020, encompasses the municipality's area as of 2021.

Economy 
In 2018, 20.9% of the workforce of Brändö worked in primary production (agriculture, forestry and fishing), 11.5% in secondary production (e.g. manufacturing, construction and infrastructure), and 58.8% in services. In 2019, the unemployment rate was 1.0%, and the share of pensioners in the population was 36.2%. 

The five largest employers in Brändö in 2019 were as follows:

 Brändö Lax Ab, 35 employees
 Municipality of Brändö, 32 employees
 Brändö Bygg Ab, 8 employees
 Brändö Andelshandel, 5 employees
 Brändö Fritidsservice Ab, 5 employees

References

External links

Municipality of Brändö – Official website
Map of Brändö

Municipalities of Åland